Martín Seri (born 9 December 1983 in Chabás, Santa Fe) is an Argentine football midfielder, who played for many football teams in Argentina.He is characterized for his ability to play different positions.

Seri was a youngster in the Newell's Old Boys youth team, when he was loaned to Atlético Tucumán in the regionalised 3rd division for the 2004-2005 season. Seri made his debut for Newell's in November 2005.

In 2008, he was loaned to San Martín de San Juan of the Primera B Nacional and in 2009 he joined Quilmesuntil 2010. In November, 2010, he played for "Talleres" in Cordoba, Argentina, and he left this club in June, 2011. That same year he became part of "Atlético Unión" team, in Mar del Plata city, where he played until June, 2012.
He is currently playing for "Tiro Federal" in Rosario, Argentina.

External links
 Football-Lineups player profile
 Epidemia Leprosa profile
 Argentine Primera statistics
 ESPN profile

1983 births
Living people
People from Caseros Department
Argentine footballers
Association football midfielders
Atlético Tucumán footballers
Newell's Old Boys footballers
San Martín de San Juan footballers
Quilmes Atlético Club footballers
Sportspeople from Santa Fe Province